Tkaczew  is a village in the administrative district of Gmina Ozorków, within Zgierz County, Łódź Voivodeship, in central Poland.

The village has a population of 10.

References

Tkaczew